The 2021 Summit League women's basketball tournament is a post-season women's basketball tournament for The Summit League. The tournament will take place March 6–9, 2021, at the Sanford Pentagon in Sioux Falls, South Dakota. The top eight teams in the final standings qualified for the tournament.

Seeds
The top eight teams by conference record in the Summit League are eligible to compete in the conference tournament. Teams are to be seeded by record within the conference, with a tiebreaker system to seed teams with identical conference records.

Schedule and results

Bracket

References

2020–21 Summit League women's basketball season
Summit League women's basketball tournament